Edward Mortimer Macdonald,  (August 16, 1865 – May 25, 1940) was a Canadian politician.

Born in Pictou, Nova Scotia, the son of John D. and Mary Isabel Macdonald, Macdonald was educated at the Pictou Academy and Dalhousie College where he received a Bachelor of Law in 1887. He was admitted to the Nova Scotia bar in 1887 and the Bar of Quebec in 1918. He was created a King's Counsel in 1904.

He first ran for House of Commons of Canada in the riding of Pictou in the 1896 federal election. Defeated, he lost again in 1900. From 1897 to 1904, he was the Nova Scotia Liberal member of the Nova Scotia House of Assembly for the electoral district of Pictou.

He was elected in the 1904 federal election. A Liberal, he was re-elected in 1908 and 1911. He did not run in 1917, but was elected again in 1921. In April 1923, he was appointed Minister without Portfolio and Minister of National Defence (Acting). From August 1923 to 1926, he was the Minister of National Defence.

Electoral record

References

Further reading

External links 
 

1865 births
1940 deaths
Liberal Party of Canada MPs
Members of the House of Commons of Canada from Nova Scotia
Members of the King's Privy Council for Canada
Nova Scotia Liberal Party MLAs
Canadian King's Counsel